51 Phantom is the second studio album by American band North Mississippi Allstars. It was released on October 9, 2001 through Tone-Cool Records. Recording sessions took place at Zebra Ranch Complex in Tate County, Mississippi. Production was handled by Jim Dickinson. It features contributions from Ben Nichols and John C. Stubblefield of Lucero, Brenda Patterson, Jackie Johnson, Susan Marshall, Othar Turner and Jim Dickinson.

The album found minor success in the US Billboard charts, peaking at number 20 on the Independent Albums and number 29 on the Heatseekers Albums. It was also nominated for a Grammy Award for Best Contemporary Blues Album at the 45th Annual Grammy Awards, but lost to Solomon Burke's Don't Give Up on Me.

Track listing

Personnel 
 Cody Dickinson – drums, washboard, guitar (tracks: 5, 11), tambourine (track 5), vocals
 Luther Dickinson – guitar, vocals
 Chris Crew – bass, vocals
 Ben Nichols – backing vocals
 Brenda Patterson – backing vocals
 Jackie Johnson – backing vocals
 Susan Marshall – backing vocals
 John C. Stubblefield – arco bowed bass
 Othar Turner – cane fife
 Jim "East Memphis Slim" Dickinson – piano, omnichord, producer
 Kevin Houston – recording
 John Hampton – mixing
 Chris Ludwinski – mastering
 Ebet Roberts – photography
 Liz Linder – photography

Charts

References

External links 
 

2001 albums
Albums produced by Jim Dickinson
North Mississippi Allstars albums